"Pincushion" is a song by American rock band ZZ Top, released from their 1994 album, Antenna. The song spent four weeks at the top of the US Billboard Album Rock Tracks chart and became a pop hit in the UK as well, peaking at number 15 on the UK Singles Chart.

Personnel
 Billy Gibbons – guitar, lead vocals
 Dusty Hill – bass, backing vocals
 Frank Beard – drums

Charts

References

ZZ Top songs
1994 singles
1994 songs
Songs written by Billy Gibbons
Songs written by Dusty Hill
Songs written by Frank Beard (musician)
Song recordings produced by Bill Ham